Deniz Aslan (born 9 February 1989) is a Turkish footballer who last played as a defender for FC Emmen.

External links

 
 

1989 births
Dutch people of Turkish descent
Living people
Turkish footballers
Elazığspor footballers
Süper Lig players
Footballers from Zaanstad
Association football defenders